AAFC  may refer to:

Sport
 Alexandra Athletic F.C., a defunct Scottish association football club
 All-America Football Conference, a professional American football league that challenged the established National Football League from 1946 to 1949
 Alloa Athletic F.C., a Scottish association football club
 Annan Athletic F.C., a Scottish association football club
 Ardwick Association Football Club, former name of Manchester City F.C., an English association football club
 Arlesey Athletic F.C., an English non-league association football club
 Ashington A.F.C., an English non-league association football club
 Ashton Athletic F.C., an English non-league association football club
 Australian Amateur Football Council, the governing body for the sport of amateur Australian rules football in the states of Victoria, South Australia and Tasmania

Other uses
 Australian Air Force Cadets, an Australian youth organisation supported by the RAAF.
 Agriculture and Agri-Food Canada a federal agency of Canada

See also 

 AFC (disambiguation)